Joe Rees (born 31 August 1990) is a Welsh rugby union player. A prop forward, he plays club rugby for the Ospreys regional team having previously played for Swansea RFC. Rees has also represented Wales at under-20 level.

On 4 February 2014, Rees left Ospreys to join Worcester Warriors in the RFU Championship from the 2014–15 season. On 9 June 2016, Rees left Worcester to join Championship club Rotherham Titans from the 2016–17 season. After stints at both Merthyr and Chinnor, Rees signed for London Scottish ahead of the 2020–21 season.

References

External links
 Ospreys profile
 Swansea profile

Welsh rugby union players
Swansea RFC players
Ospreys (rugby union) players
1990 births
Living people
Rugby union players from Swansea
Worcester Warriors players
Rotherham Titans players
Cardiff Rugby players
London Scottish F.C. players
Rugby union props